Solalinde is a Spanish surname. Notable people with the surname include:
Alejandro Solalinde (born 1945), Mexican Catholic priest and human rights champion
Alicio Solalinde (born 1952), Paraguayan footballer
Antonio Solalinde (1892–1937), Spanish writer, professor and philologist
Jesusa Alfau Galván de Solalinde (1895–1943), Spanish-born American novelist, painter and educator

Spanish-language surnames